Altisferi is a surname. Notable people with the surname include:

Lekë Zaharia Altisferi (died 1444), Albanian lord in Scutari
Vrana Altisferi (died 1458), general and counselor of Skanderbeg